Daniel Pik (born 20 July 2000) is a Polish professional footballer who plays as a forward for Radomiak Radom.

References

External links

2000 births
Living people
People from Pułtusk
Polish footballers
Association football forwards
MKS Cracovia (football) players
Radomiak Radom players
Ekstraklasa players
III liga players
IV liga players
Poland youth international footballers